Air Vice-Marshal William Hopton Anderson,  (30 December 1891 – 30 December 1975) was a senior commander in the Royal Australian Air Force (RAAF). He flew with the Australian Flying Corps in World War I, earning the Distinguished Flying Cross and the Belgian Croix de guerre, and leading Nos. 3 and 7 Squadrons. Anderson commanded the Australian Air Corps during its brief existence in 1920–21, before joining the fledgling RAAF. The service's third most senior officer, he primarily held posts on the Australian Air Board in the inter-war years. He was appointed a Commander of the Order of the British Empire in 1934, and promoted to air commodore in 1938.

At the utbreak of World War II, Anderson was Air Member for Supply. In 1940 he acted as Chief of the Air Staff between the resignation of Air Vice-Marshal Stanley Goble in January and the arrival of Air Chief Marshal Sir Charles Burnett, RAF, the next month. He led the newly formed Central and Eastern Area Commands between December 1940 and July 1943, briefly returning to the Air Board as Air Member for Organisation and Equipment in 1941–42. Anderson was founding Commandant of the RAAF Staff School from July to November 1943, and held this post again from October 1944 until his retirement in April 1946. Known to his colleagues as "Andy" or "Mucker", he died on his birthday in 1975.

Early life and World War I
Born on 30 December 1891 in Kew, a suburb of Melbourne, William Hopton Anderson was the third son of English-born surveyor Edward Anderson and his wife Florence (née Handfield), a native Victorian. Anderson was educated at Melbourne Church of England Grammar School, where he joined the cadet corps. He began his professional military career as a Royal Australian (Garrison) Artillery officer in December 1910, before transferring to the Australian Naval and Military Expeditionary Force, based at Rabaul in what was then German New Guinea, in March 1915. The following January, Anderson joined the Australian Flying Corps (AFC) as a captain, serving with No. 1 Squadron in Palestine. He was posted to No. 3 Squadron (designated No. 69 Squadron Royal Flying Corps by the British) in August 1917, operating Royal Aircraft Factory R.E.8 two-seat reconnaissance aircraft on the Western Front.

From October 1917, No. 3 Squadron was heavily involved in artillery ranging, activity that left the slow R.E.8s vulnerable to attack by enemy fighters. Twice that month Anderson's plane was dived upon by several German aircraft. He was, in his own words, "too scared to think" on the first occasion, but both times managed to manoeuvre his plane so that his observer could hold off their opponents with Lewis Gun fire until other R.E.8s came to their aid. Anderson was spotting for artillery near the Messines Ridge on 6 December when he engaged a German two-seat DFW that observer John Bell was able to shoot down; it was No. 3 Squadron's first confirmed aerial victory.

In January 1918, Anderson was given the temporary rank of major and posted to England to take charge of No. 7 (Training) Squadron AFC. He was recommended for the Military Cross (MC) on 12 March for his achievements with No. 3 Squadron in France, the citation noting his "resolute fight" and "cool and capable flying" in evading attacks by enemy aircraft and successfully carrying out his reconnaissance missions. In the event, he was awarded the Distinguished Flying Cross (DFC) in the King's Birthday Honours promulgated in the London Gazette on 3 June, becoming the first Australian to receive the newly created decoration. He was also awarded the Belgian Croix de guerre, gazetted on 9 July. Anderson returned to France in October 1918 as commanding officer of No. 3 Squadron. His service earned him a mention in despatches on 11 July 1919.

Inter-war years

Anderson relinquished command of No. 3 Squadron in January 1919 and returned to Australia two months later. In December that year the AFC was disbanded, to be replaced on 1 January 1920 by the short-lived Australian Air Corps (AAC), which was, like the AFC, a branch of the Army. The AFC's senior officer, Lieutenant Colonel Richard Williams, was still in England, and Major Anderson was appointed commander of the AAC, a position that also put him in charge of Central Flying School (CFS) at Point Cook, Victoria. On 31 March 1921, he joined the newly formed Australian Air Force ("Royal" being added in August) as a squadron leader, becoming its third most senior officer after Williams and former Royal Naval Air Service pilot Stanley Goble, both now wing commanders.

During 1921, Anderson commanded the RAAF's Point Cook base and Point Cook's two major units, No. 1 Flying Training School (No. 1 FTS)—the successor to CFS—and the newly established No. 1 Aircraft Depot (No. 1 AD). Over the next four years he acted as Director of Personnel and Training, Chief of the Administrative Staff, and Second Air Member on the RAAF's controlling body, the Air Board, when Goble was away on overseas postings. In April 1922, Anderson took part in the new service's first army co-operation exercise, piloting an Airco DH9 with Flight Lieutenant Adrian Cole, who spotted for artillery firing from an emplacement at Queenscliff, Victoria. A year later, Anderson proposed a special RAAF workshop for research and development, which was duly formed at Point Cook later that year.

The young Air Force staged many public displays in its early years; on one such occasion over the Melbourne suburb of Essendon in September 1924, Anderson, Ray Brownell and another pilot took part in a mock dogfight while ace Harry Cobby gave a demonstration of balloon busting. During 1925–26, Anderson again took command of No. 1 FTS, as well as occupying a position on the Air Board as Air Member for Personnel. He was posted to England between 1927 and 1929, attending RAF Staff College, Andover, and serving as Air Liaison Officer (ALO) to the British Air Ministry. On 23 March 1927 he was promoted to wing commander. As ALO in 1928, he provided information to the Air Board concerning shortcomings of the de Havilland Hound light day bomber, then being strongly considered for the RAAF, that led to the Westland Wapiti being ordered instead.

Returning to Australia in mid-1929, Anderson was for a short time in charge of No. 1 AD, now based at RAAF Station Laverton, Victoria, before appointment to the Air Board as Air Member for Supply in October. He spent most of the 1930s in this position, aside from an acting role as Air Member for Personnel in 1933–34, and attendance at the Imperial Defence College, London, the following year. Anderson had no formal training in the supply field, and though regarded with affection was variously considered "not quite on the same wave length as others" and "so immersed in the minutiae of administration that some important policy matters languished". His chronic shyness with women other than his unmarried sister also made him an object of fun in some quarters.  He was raised to group captain in December 1932 and air commodore in January 1938. Appointed an Officer of the Order of the British Empire (OBE) in the 1933 King's Birthday Honours, he was promoted Commander in the same order (CBE) in the 1934 New Year Honours.

World War II

Anderson was still serving as Air Member for Supply when Australia declared war in September 1939. On 9 January 1940 he was appointed acting Chief of the Air Staff (CAS), following the resignation of the incumbent, Air Vice-Marshal Goble. Anderson remained in the position until 10 February, when Air Chief Marshal Sir Charles Burnett, seconded from the Royal Air Force, arrived to take over. The Australian government at this stage had so little faith in the leadership of its Air Force that it had briefly considered offering temporary command of the service to a Royal Australian Navy officer, Second Naval Member Commodore Maitland Boucher, before deciding against such a "monumental slight to the senior ranks of the RAAF" and settling on Anderson. After relinquishing his temporary position as CAS, Anderson briefly reverted to his previous role as Air Member for Supply before taking over as Air Member for Personnel (AMP) in March 1940; he was succeeded as AMP in November by Air Vice-Marshal Henry Wrigley. The next month, Anderson took over from Air Commodore Cole as Air Officer Commanding Central Area, with responsibility for air defence, protection of adjacent sea lanes, and aerial reconnaissance for most of New South Wales; he remained at this post until it was disbanded in August the following year.

Promoted acting air vice-marshal in September 1941, Anderson resumed his position on the Air Board by replacing Air Marshal Williams as Air Member for Organisation and Equipment. In May 1942, he assumed command of the newly established Eastern Area, which was headquartered in Sydney and controlled seven squadrons from southern Queensland to southern New South Wales. One of the area's main roles was anti-submarine warfare; its squadrons also included fighters and army co-operation aircraft. In July 1943 Anderson became the inaugural Commandant of the RAAF Staff School at Mount Martha, Victoria. The school was instituted to further the training of officers at the squadron leader and wing commander level, whose basic education standards Anderson, among others, found sadly lacking. In December 1943 he was again appointed AMP, taking over from Air Commodore Frank Lukis, before returning to command the RAAF Staff School in September 1944. He continued in the latter role until being forcibly retired, along with several other senior Air Force commanders, in April 1946, ostensibly to make way for younger and equally qualified officers. A confidential report in September 1944 had found him "hard working, conscientious and loyal" but lacking in "constructive capacity and organising ability". He was still four years below the statutory retirement age of fifty-seven for his substantive rank of air commodore.

Retirement
Following his discharge from the RAAF as an honorary air vice marshal, Anderson lived in East Melbourne. A lifelong bachelor, he shared a house with his sister, who also never married. From 1947 until 1971, Anderson served as honorary chairman of the Victorian branch of the Services Canteens Trust Fund. On 31 March 1971, he was among a select group of surviving founder members of the RAAF who attended a celebratory dinner at the Hotel Canberra to mark the service's Golden Jubilee; his fellow guests included Air Marshal Williams, Air Vice-Marshal Wrigley, Air Commodore Hippolyte (Frank) De La Rue, and Wing Commander Sir Lawrence Wackett. Anderson died at his residence on his 84th birthday in 1975, and was buried in Boroondara General Cemetery, Kew.

Notes

References

 

 
 
 
 
 
 
 
 
 
 
 
 
 

|-

|-

|-

|-

1891 births
1975 deaths
Military personnel from Melbourne
Graduates of the Royal College of Defence Studies
Australian aviators
Australian Army officers
Australian Flying Corps officers
Australian military personnel of World War I
Australian people of English descent
Australian Commanders of the Order of the British Empire
Australian recipients of the Distinguished Flying Cross (United Kingdom)
Royal Australian Air Force air marshals of World War II
People from Kew, Victoria